Nicholas Jones (died 1695) was an Irish politician.

Jones represented Naas in the Irish House of Commons between 1692 and 1693.

References

Year of birth unknown
1695 deaths
Irish MPs 1692–1693
Members of the Parliament of Ireland (pre-1801) for County Kildare constituencies